Felicia namaquana is a glandular-hairy, branching annual plant of up to  high that is assigned to the family Asteraceae. It is sometimes called Bloublommetjie or pers poublom in Afrikaans. Flowering occurs between May and October. It grows in Namibia and South Africa.

Description 
The central branch is upright, but lateral branches start off outwards at base, bending upwards. The branches are thickly set with leaves, particularly near the base.

Those in the outer row are about 1 mm (0.04 in) wide, lance-shaped, roughly and glandular hairy with a fringe of hairs near the tip. Those in the inner row narrowly obovate, 1 mm wide, with a broad papery margin and eventually hairless. In the center of each corolla are five anthers merged into a tube, through which the style grows when the floret opens, hoovering up the pollen on its shaft. At the tip of both style branches is a narrowly triangular appendage. Around the base of the corolla are many white pappus bristles with teeth, that are easily discarded. The dry, one-seeded, indehiscent fruits called cypselae are large, 3 mm (0.12 in) long and 1 mm (0.6 in) wide, inverted egg-shaped, yellowish brown to brown, with a strong marginal ridge, with thick, -1 mm (0.02–0.04 in) with short, robust hairs.

Felicia namaquana is a diploid having five sets of homologue chromosomes (2n=10).

Taxonomy 
Many scientific names have been given to this species because it is very variable. In 1865 William Henry Harvey, described both Aster namaquanus and Aster elongatus var. candollei. Karl August Otto Hoffmann described Felicia schenckii in 1898, J. Mattfeld added Felicia prageri in 1921, and Edwin Percy Phillips distinguished Susanna dinteri in 1950, all of them honoring the collector of the specimens described. In 1960, Hermann Merxmüller reassigned Harvey's species and made the new combination Felicia namaquana. In 1973 Jürke Grau considered all of these name synonymous. The species is considered to be part of the section Neodetris.

Distribution 
The pers poublom occurs in the wild from Namibia, through Bushmanland and Namaqualand, via Hantam to Worcester and extends eastwards into the Great Karoo. It grows on sandy or gravelly plains.

Conservation 
The continued survival of Felicia namaquana is considered to be of least concern because the population is stable.

References

External links 
 photos of Felicia namaquana on iNaturalist
 distribution map of Felicia namaquana

namaquana
Flora of Southern Africa
Plants described in 1836